Patrick Kipngeno (born 18 June 1993, Bomet County, Kenya) is a Kenyan mountain runner. He primarily competes in mountain and trail races in Italy, France, Switzerland, and Austria.

As of 2022, Kipngeno is based in Austria.

Competition record
Competition record:

References

External links

1993 births
Living people
Kenyan male long-distance runners
Kenyan mountain runners
Kenyan expatriate sportspeople in Austria
People from Bomet County
Kenyan expatriates in Austria